Cheers, to Those Who Stay is a 2010 Lebanese short film by Cyril Aris and Mounia Akl.

Synopsis
Cheers, to Those Who Stay revolves around Kyle, a Lebanese expatriate living in Detroit and studying filmmaking there. Kyle returns to Lebanon to deal with what he describes as a director's block and to get film material for his project. Kyle stays at his cousins flat where he meets his relatives: Omar a wannabe actor who is stuck in a clerical job; Maissa a controlling character who is always right; Alex a lazy bone and speedster; Joana the underdog obsessed with cleanliness and Ziad the hopeless romantic. Through his cousins Kyle experiences Lebanese everyday people, their problems, joie de vivre and complaints about the life in Beirut.

Cast
 Kyle Stephens as Kyle
 Cyril Aris as Omar
 Mounia Akl as Maissa
 Karl Noujeim as Alex
 Panos Aprahamian as Ziad
 Diane Mehanna as Joana

Awards
 Los Angeles Film Festival of Hollywood Award of Merit  fall 2010.
 Los Angeles Movie Awards Honorable mention 2010.

References

External links
 

2010 films
2010s Arabic-language films
2010s English-language films
2010 short films
Lebanese short films
2010 multilingual films
Lebanese multilingual films